Siloxerus is a genus of Australian plants in the tribe Gnaphalieae within the family Asteraceae.

 Species
 Siloxerus filifolius (Benth.) Ostenf.
 Siloxerus humifusus Labill.
 Siloxerus multiflorus (Nees) Nees
 Siloxerus pygmaeus (A.Gray) P.S.Short
 formerly included
see Angianthus Gnephosis Pogonolepis 
 Siloxerus brachypappus (F.Muell.) Ising - Angianthus brachypappus F.Muell.
 Siloxerus pusillus (Benth.) Ising - Gnephosis tenuissima Cass.
 Siloxerus strictus (Steetz) Ostenf. - Pogonolepis stricta Steetz
 Siloxerus tenellus (F.Muell.) Ostenf. - Gnephosis drummondii (A.Gray) P.S.Short

References

Gnaphalieae
Endemic flora of Australia
Asteraceae genera
Taxa named by Jacques Labillardière